Australian rules football has been played on an organised basis in Wales since 2007, Mae pêl-droed Rheolau Awstralaidd yn cael ei chwarae ar faes hirgrwn. Mae deunaw ddewisol bob ochr. with the league and representative teams run and managed by the Welsh Australian Rules Football League (WARFL) who is the controlling body of the sport in the country.  All six senior teams in the WARFL are named after clubs in the South Australian National Football League. Prior to 2007 some clubs played in the BARFL but the rising popularity of Australian Football demanded the creation of a Welsh league.

History
Australian rules football was first played in Wales in 1944 when the 462 Squadron played against the second Sunderland Squadron formed teams based on State of Origin (Victoria vs Western Australia) to play a match at Pembroke Dock.

Regular competition in Wales began with the formation of Aussie Rules Wales in September 2006.  Thereafter three teams were formed in 2007 being Cardiff Double Blues, South Cardiff Panthers and Swansea Magpies and competed in a 9-a-side format with modified rules in the Welsh division (WAFL) of the ARUK National league.  Also the Swindon Devils from England's West Country competed as a guest fourth side. The season concluded with the Swindon Devils defeating South Cardiff by 71 points to win the inaugural (and only) WAFL Premiership.

Aussie Rules Wales then ceased trading in January 2008 and was replaced by the independently run WARFL, which seeks to become the national governing body of the sport in Wales.

The inaugural WARFL Premiership season kicked off in May 2008, with the Cardiff Double Blues, South Cardiff Panthers and Swansea Magpies competing in 9 rounds in 9-a-side format with full AFL rules.  The Cardiff Double Blues eventually defeated South Cardiff Panthers by 94 points to win the inaugural 2008 WARFL Premiership. South Cardiff Panthers' David James was awarded best on ground.

In 2009 Gwent Tigers based in Newport joined the league in a 12 round competition with the 9-a-side format unchanged. Also that year the WARFL introduced a pre-season competition known as the Cymru Clwb Cup played at Waunarlwydd RFC in Swansea where the three foundation clubs competed. The Cardiff Double Blues won the tournament winning both of their round robin matches.

At the end of the Premiership South Cardiff Panthers played Swansea Magpies at Llandaff Fields in Cardiff where South Cardiff won by two points to win their first Premiership after being runners up in 2007 and 2008. Swansea Magpies' Matthew Hopkins was awarded best on ground.

2010 saw further expansion of the league with the Vale Warriors based at Barry RFC entering. The second Cymru Clwb Challenge was played at Llandaff Fields with all WARFL clubs playing except for Gwent Tigers who did not field a team due to player unavailability. South Cardiff Panthers won all their matches winning the competition with Cardiff Doubles Blues player Rhys Morgan awarded player of the tournament.

That year the league ran as a 10 round competition with each team playing 8 matches and having 2 byes and continuing in the 9-a-side format. On 24 July the top of the league South Cardiff Panthers played against Swansea Magpies at Barry RFC where South Cardiff won by 71 points to be the first club in WARFL history to win consecutive Premierships. South Cardiff Panthers' ruckman Chris James was awarded best on ground.

The Bridgend Eagles and Bristol Dockers joined the league in 2011 with Gwent Tigers not fielding a team that year.

Players

Men's

Women's

WARFL Clubs
The league is organised in a similar fashion to the SANFL, with the top two teams at the end of the "home and away" season playing off in the Grand Final for the Premiership Cup.

WARFL League & Grand Final Results

WARFL Player Awards

League and National representative teams
Two representative sides are organised by the WARFL, one to represent the national league which is an all-stars side known as the "WARFL Red Devils" drawn solely from the WARFL regardless of nationality.

The other representative team organised by the WARFL is the Welsh national team known as the "Cymru Red Dragons". The Red Dragons is primarily made up of players from the WARFL, however does include Welsh players from other leagues around the world.

WARFL Red Devils

The Red Devils first played in the 2007 AFL Britain National Championships known as the Brit Cup, representing the first Welsh side in the tournament's history. Thereafter the Red Devils have played in every Brit Cup including the 2010 tournament but 2012 was the year the Brit Cup made Wales its home for next 12 months as the Devils made the Grand Final that year beating the Favourites the Midland Tigers taking top spot and making history. The Red Devils have also appeared at the 2008 "Haggis Cup" the first time a Welsh team had played in Scotland and again in 2009 but did not field a team in 2010.

Cymru Red Dragons

In November 2007, the Red Dragons became the first all-Welsh representative team when they hosted the England Dragonslayers in Cardiff for the "Dragon Cup", England winning by 30 points.

In the second series of the Dragon Cup, the Cymru Red Dragons defeated 2008 EU Cup champions England Dragonslayers in Reading and Newport by 92 points (aggregate score over two tests) to win the Dragon Cup for the first time. However in September 2009 England defeated Wales in Cardiff and London to regain the Dragon Cup.

The inaugural "Bute Series" for the Crichton-Stuart Cup with Scotland Clansmen (which was also Scotland's first ever Australian Rules football international) was played in Glasgow and Cardiff over two tests in October 2009. The Cymru Red Dragons won the series on aggregate of 30 points with Scotland winning the first test and Wales winning at home in Cardiff the following week.

National Team Results

Wales Player Awards

Great Britain Bulldogs
As of 2013, 15 players from the WARFL have been selected to represent the Great Britain Bulldogs, these being:

Andrew Atack (Cardiff Panthers), Tim Atkins (Swansea Magpies), David Carpenter (Cardiff Double Blues), Liam Corbett (Cardiff Panthers), Joshua Davey (Cardiff Panthers), Ed Doe (Cardiff Panthers), Tom Gillard (Cardiff Double Blues), Mark Horsman (Cardiff Panthers), Chris James (Cardiff Panthers) David James (Cardiff Panthers), Tom Judson (Cardiff Double Blues), David Saunders (Cardiff Panthers), Gareth Sturge (Cardiff Double Blues), Jon Saunders (South Cardiff Panthers), Owain Ryland (South Cardiff Panthers) & Eliot Rich (South Cardiff Panthers).

See also

Australian rules football in Wales
List of Australian rules football leagues outside Australia

References

External links
WARFL website
Bridgend Eagles website
Bristol Dockers website
Cardiff Double Blues website
Gwent Tigers website
South Cardiff Panthers website
Swansea Magpies website
Vale Warriors website
SANFL website

 
Australian rules football governing bodies outside Australia
Welsh Australian